Copernic may refer to
 Copernic Inc., Search Technology Company
 Copernic Desktop Search, Desktop Search Software
 Nicolaus Copernicus, a Renaissance-era mathematician and astronomer
 Éditions Copernic, France-based publisher